Andreas Fakudze (died 2001) served as acting Prime Minister of Swaziland (now Eswatini) from 25 October 1993 to 4 November 1993.

Biography 
In 1993, King Mswati III appointed him as a temporary prime minister from the moment of Obed Dlamini's resignation after the parliamentary elections, and before the new cabinet of Jameson Mbilini Dlamini was sworn in. He maintained power over all 16 ministries.

References

Year of birth missing
Prime Ministers of Eswatini
2001 deaths